The Matura Formation is a geologic formation in Trinidad and Tobago. It preserves bivalve and gastropod fossils dating back to the Pliocene period.

See also 

 List of fossiliferous stratigraphic units in Trinidad and Tobago

References 

Geologic formations of Trinidad and Tobago
Neogene Trinidad and Tobago